Melanargia galathea, the marbled white, is a medium-sized butterfly in the family Nymphalidae.
Despite its common name and appearance, this butterfly is one of the "browns", of the subfamily Satyrinae.

This species can be found across most of Europe, southern Russia, Asia Minor and Iran.
The caterpillars feed on various grasses.

Subspecies
Subspecies include:
Melanargia galathea galathea Europe, southern Urals
Melanargia galathea donsa Fruhstorfer, 1916 Caucasus
Melanargia galathea lucasi (Rambur, 1858) North Africa
Melanargia galathea magdalenae Reichl, 1975
Melanargia galathea procida (Herbst, 1796)
Melanargia galathea satnia Fruhstorfer, 1917 (= njurdzhan Sheljuzhko) Caucasus Major and Minor
Melanargia galathea tenebrosa Fruhstorfer, 1917

Distribution
This species can be found across most of Europe, southern Russia, Asia Minor and Iran. There is an isolated population in Japan. It is not found in Ireland, North Britain, Scandinavia (except Denmark) and Portugal or Spain. The late twentieth century saw an expansion of its range in the UK.

Habitat
It is found in forest clearings and edges, meadows and steppe where it occurs up to 1,500-1,700 m above sea level. They are a common sight in unimproved grasslands across southern Britain, particularly on the South Downs, but also extending slightly further north to places such as the Dunstable Downs.

Description

In these medium-sized butterflies the upper side of the wings is decorated with white and gray-black or dark brown  markings, but it is always gray-black or dark brown checkered in the basal and distal areas. The underside is similar to the upper side but the drawings is light gray or light brown. On the underside of the hindwings is present a row of gray eye spots. The males and the females are quite similar, except that some females may have a yellowish nuance on the underside of the wings. Seitz - M. galathea. In the otherwise black cell of both wing an oval white spot which is not divided by a transverse bar. On the hindwing above the ocelli are quite invisible or shine through very faintly from the underside.

 

This species is rather similar to the Iberian marbled white (Melanargia lachesis) that replaces M. galathea in Spain and southern France.

The caterpillars are about 28 millimeters long. They are green or yellow with some lighter and darker narrow longitudinal lines. The head is always light brown.

Life cycle
Like other members of its subfamily, the larvae feed on various grasses. These include Phleum (P. pratense), Poa (P. annua, P. trivalis), Festuca rubra, Bromus erectus, Dactylis, Brachypodium pinnatum, Agrostis capillaris, Elytrigia, Holcus, Dactylis, Triticum and Agropyron species .

Eggs are laid on the wing, or from brief perches on grass stems, and are just sprinkled among the grass stems. Upon hatching, the larvae immediately enter hibernation and only feed the following spring when the fresh growth occurs. They are a lime-green colour, with a dark green line running down the middle of their back. Pupation takes place at ground level in a loose cocoon. Adults can be found from early June to early September. On a good site, in warm, sunny weather, thousands can be seen gently fluttering amongst the grass heads.

Alternative common names

The marbled white was called "Our Half-mourner" by James Petiver (1717), "The Marmoris" by Benjamin Wilkes and "The Marmoress" by Moses Harris.

References

External links
Lepiforum 
 Paolo Mazzei, Daniel Morel, Raniero Panfili Moths and Butterflies of Europe and North Africa
 Kimmo Silvonen Larvae of North-European Lepidoptera

galathea
Butterflies of Asia
Butterflies of Europe
Insects of the Middle East
Insects of Afghanistan
Lepidoptera of Israel
Butterflies described in 1758
Taxa named by Carl Linnaeus